The 1994–95 Cypriot Second Division was the 40th season of the Cypriot second-level football league. Evagoras won their 6th title.

Format
Eleven teams participated in the 1994–95 Cypriot Second Division. The league consisted of three rounds with ten match weeks in each round. In the first two rounds all teams played against each other twice, once at their home and once away.

The home teams for the third round matches were determined based on their league table position after the end of the second round. 

The team with the most points at the end of the season crowned champions. The first two teams were promoted to 1995–96 Cypriot First Division. No team was relegated to the 1995–96 Cypriot Third Division.

Changes from previous season
Teams promoted to 1994–95 Cypriot First Division
 Aris Limassol

Teams relegated from 1993–94 Cypriot First Division
 Evagoras Paphos
 APEP

Note: EPA Larnaca was also relegated from the 1993–94 Cypriot First Division. However, before the start of the season, Pezoporikos Larnaca and EPA Larnaca were merged forming AEK Larnaca, which took the place of Pezoporikos Larnaca in the Cypriot First Division.

Teams promoted from 1993–94 Cypriot Third Division
 Othellos Athienou

Teams relegated to 1994–95 Cypriot Third Division
 Orfeas Nicosia
 Ermis Aradippou
 APEP Pelendriou
 Chalkanoras Idaliou
 Ethnikos Assia

League standings

See also
 Cypriot Second Division
 1994–95 Cypriot First Division
 1994–95 Cypriot Cup

Sources

Cypriot Second Division seasons
Cyprus
1994–95 in Cypriot football